The 152 mm howitzer M1909 was a Russian Empire 152.4 mm (6 inch) howitzer.  Developed by the French arms manufacturer Schneider et Cie it saw service throughout World War I.

Initially it was classified as fortress howitzer (Russian: kryepostnaya gaubitsa), compared to the lighter Schneider design, 152 mm howitzer M1910, which was adopted as a field howitzer. However, during World War I it started to be used as a field howitzer as well. It was later developed by the Soviet Union into the 152 mm howitzer M1909/30 which saw service throughout the Great Patriotic War.

See also 
 120 mm Armata wz. 78/09/31 – Polish gun which used the carriage of the M1909.

References 

World War I howitzers
World War I artillery of Russia
152 mm artillery